The following is a list of works by Sophie Gengembre Anderson (1823–1903).

References

Anderson,Sophie